P.O.5 (Party on Five) was a Sunday noontime musical variety show that aired on TV5. The show premiered on April 11, 2010, and was broadcast live from the Westside Studios at the Broadway Centrum in Quezon City. Unlike its rivals ASAP and Party Pilipinas, P.O.5 featured mini-game and talent search segments. It aired its last episode on February 20, 2011. It was succeeded by Fan*tastik.

Hosts

Main
Lucy Torres-Gomez
Richard Gomez
John Estrada
Mr. Fu
Wilma 
Tuesday Vargas
Morissette

Performers
Lani Misalucha
JC de Vera
Danita Paner
Alex Gonzaga
Jasmine Curtis-Smith
Kean Cipriano
Rainier Castillo
Jon Avila
IC Mendoza
Carla Humphries
 Mara Alberto
Lucky Mercado
Jan Nieto
Gloc-9
Jay Durias (Musical Director)
Rufa Mi
Gerald Santos
Wendy Valdez
Princess Ryan
Mocha Uson 
Leah Patricio
Apple Chiu
Frenchie Dy
Yana Asistio
Andrew Wolf
Chesster Chay
Keanna Reeves

Retsu & Dancing Models
Retsu
 Marj Cornillez
 Sara Custodio
 Wen Santos
 Mira Baino
 Raine Larrazabal
 Gemma Gatdula
 Jayna Reyes
 Sheena Sy
 Bambi Del Rosario
 Joy Pagurayan
 Elf Stehr
 Jen Olivar
 Rina Lorilla
 Grendel Alvarado

Studios
KB Entertainment Studios (April 11 to October 10, 2010)
Westside Studio, Broadway Centrum (October 17, 2010, to February 20, 2011)

See also
List of programs broadcast by The 5 Network
List of programs aired by The 5 Network

References
PEP.ph (accessed 19 April 2010)

Philippine variety television shows
2010 Philippine television series debuts
2011 Philippine television series endings
TV5 (Philippine TV network) original programming
Philippine music television series
Filipino-language television shows